This is a complete list of bird species and subspecies that have been recorded on King Island, Tasmania, Australia.

List of birds

References 

King Island Tasmania
 
King Island (Tasmania)
King Island birds